As of the start of the 2023–24 NBL season, there will have been 151 NBL Coaches.

2 new Head Coaches will begin in the 2023-24 season:

Brisbane Bullets - Justin Schueller

South East Melbourne Phoenix - TBA

Bold type indicates current Head/Stand-in Coaches.

References

 
Australian records
Basketball statistics